Sheroes Cup (formerly called Naija Ratels Pre-Season Championship then Flying Officers Cup) is an annual preseason tournament for women's association football teams in Africa. The competition usually feature elite teams from Nigeria Women Premier League, as well as neighboring African countries and is supported by the Nigeria Women Football League. Since the first edition in 2019, it has been described as the biggest preseason tournament for women club football in Nigeria. 

Just before the commencement of the second edition, it was rebranded as "Flying Officers Cup" to honor and immortalize the recently deceased Nigeria first-ever female combat helicopter pilot, Tolulope Arotile.

In 2021, there was a hundred percent increase in the prize money from the 2020 edition. The first, second, third and fourth placed teams are to receive ₦1,000,000, ₦500,000, ₦300,000 and ₦200,000 respectively. 

In October 2022, it was renamed to "Sheroes Cup".

History 
The competition is founded and financed by Barrister Paul Edeh, through his sport firm domiciled in Benue State. For the first edition, twenty women football clubs in Nigeria was invited but only four decided to honour the invitation. The inaugural tournament was contested by hosts, Naija Ratels; top tier teams, Nasarawa Amazons and Edo Queens; and lower pyramid team, Honey Badgers from Northern Nigerian state of Kaduna. Edo Queens emerged winners following a straight round robin format. All participating teams received free sporting souvenirs, including soccer balls and jerseys.

The second edition saw the introduction of prize money, as well as removing registration fees due to the financial impacts of COVID 19 on participating teams. It was also officially ratified by the Nigeria Women Football League. The tournament venue was relocated from Benue State to Abuja.Bayelsa Queens emerged winners through a more traditional initial group phase, then elimination stages matches format.

The third edition saw the ratification of an organizing committee that included many major national stakeholders in women's football. The prize money was also significantly increased and the tournament was billed to involve other African countries for the first time. The number of teams was also increased to 12. The competition is scheduled to start on 22nd of August.

Top scorers

Most valuable player

Tournament format

Results

References 

Recurring sporting events established in 2019
International women's association football invitational tournaments